Firman McClure (November 19, 1861 – March 28, 1901) was a lawyer, editor and political figure in Nova Scotia, Canada. He represented Colchester County in the Nova Scotia House of Assembly from 1896 to 1897 and Colchester in the House of Commons of Canada from 1897 to 1900 as a Liberal member.

He was born in Truro, Nova Scotia, the son of John McClure and Susan Kent, and educated in the provincial normal school there. In 1896, he married Dora M. Inglis. He was a prominent member of the Sons of Temperance in Nova Scotia. McClure was editor and publisher for the Truro Guardian and then was editor of the Temperance Index. He practised law in Truro. He ran unsuccessfully for a federal seat in 1896. McClure was unsuccessful in a bid for reelection in 1900. He died in Truro at the age of 39.

Electoral record

References 

1861 births
1901 deaths
Liberal Party of Canada MPs
Members of the House of Commons of Canada from Nova Scotia
Nova Scotia Liberal Party MLAs
People from Truro, Nova Scotia
Nova Scotia Teachers College alumni